Lenny Platt (born July 25, 1984) is an American actor known for his portrayal of Nate Salinger on the US daytime soap opera One Life to Live from 2010 to 2012 and FBI recruit Drew Perales on the ABC thriller Quantico in 2016.

Early life
Born in Philadelphia, Pennsylvania, Platt moved with his family to Florida at age 12. He graduated in criminology from the University of Florida in 2006.

Career
Platt began portraying the recurring role of Nate Salinger on the US daytime soap opera One Life to Live in April 2010, and was put on contract with the series in October 2010. His last appearance on One Life to Live was in January 2012 when the show was cancelled by ABC. Platt next played guest roles on two other New York-based series, Law & Order: Special Victims Unit and Blue Bloods, in 2013. He also voiced the character Gianni in the video game Grand Theft Auto V. Platt appeared in multiple episodes of ABC's How to Get Away with Murder as college quarterback Griffin O'Reilly in 2014 and 2015. In 2016, Platt portrayed the recurring role of FBI recruit Drew Perales on the ABC thriller Quantico.

On February 24, 2017, it was announced that Platt was cast in a recurring role as Felix in the CBS television pilot Perfect Citizen. However, the network passed on the pilot in May 2017.

Recently, Platt starred as Sgt. Kyle Ormond in the National Geographic miniseries The Hot Zone.

Filmography

Television

Videogames

References

External links
 
 

Living people
1984 births
American male soap opera actors
American male television actors
Male actors from Philadelphia
University of Florida alumni
21st-century American male actors